Verticordia cooloomia, commonly known as Cooloomia verticordia,  is a flowering plant in the myrtle family, Myrtaceae and is endemic to the south-west of Western Australia. It is an open, spreading shrub with large heads of sharply scented yellow flowers and is only known from areas in and near to the Cooloomia Nature Reserve, near the Murchison River.

Description

The petals are also golden-yellow, almost circular in shape with an irregularly toothed margin. Flowering time is from October to November.

The species is somewhat similar to Verticordia nitens, V. aurea and V. patens but is easily distinguished from them by the larger size of its leaves and flowers.

Taxonomy and naming
Verticordia cooloomia was first formally described by Alex George in 1991 and the description was published in Nuytsia from specimens collected at Murchison House Station by George and others in 1986. The species had previously been discovered by Stephen Hopper in 1979 in the Cooloomia Nature Reserve. The specific epithet (cooloomia) is from the name of the reserve where the species was discovered.

In the same paper, George placed this species in subgenus Chrysoma and as the only species in section Cooloomia.

Distribution and habitat
This verticordia grows on sand ridges in heath and shrubland in and near the lower reaches of the Murchison River in the Geraldton Sandplains biogeographic region. It forms a part of the Shark Bay tree heath.

Conservation
Verticordia cooloomia is classified as  "Priority Three" by the Western Australian Government Department of Parks and Wildlife, meaning that it is poorly known and known from only a few locations but is not under imminent threat.

Use in horticulture
Verticordia cooloomia is variously described as "very ornamental" and "a spectacular shrub, especially when plant in association with large rocks". It is usually propagated from cuttings and has been grown in a wide variety of soil types and climatic conditions although full sun is required for good flowering. The species is intolerant of phosphorus-containing fertiliser but is drought tolerant and responds well to pruning after damage by severe frosts.

References

cooloomia
Endemic flora of Western Australia
Myrtales of Australia
Rosids of Western Australia
Vulnerable flora of Australia
Plants described in 1991